Myristica atrescens is a species of plant in the family Myristicaceae. It is endemic to Papua New Guinea.

References

atrescens
Plants described in 1995
Vulnerable plants
Flora of Papua New Guinea
Endemic flora of Papua New Guinea
Taxonomy articles created by Polbot